The Meeting de Atletismo Madrid is an annual international athletics meeting that takes place at the Centro Deportivo Municipal Moratalaz in Madrid, Spain. The inaugural edition took place in 1979 at Estadio de Vallehermoso. After several years the meeting moved from 1994 until 2004 to Estadio de Madrid and then back to Vallehermoso from until 2008. Until 2020 it was part of the IAAF World Challenge and is now a World Athletics Continental Tour Silver meeting.

Meeting records

Men

Women

References

External links 
 Meeting Madrid homepage
 Meeting Madrid records

Athletics competitions in Spain
Sports competitions in Madrid
IAAF World Challenge
IAAF Grand Prix
IAAF Super Grand Prix
Recurring sporting events established in 1979
IAAF World Outdoor Meetings